The Tekna is a semi-nomadic Sahrawi tribal confederation of Lamta Sanhaja Berber and Arab Hassani origins. Its constituents today inhabit southern Morocco and northern Western Sahara, but traditionally with wider migration routes. Nowadays, its population is estimated to be around 709,000.

Demographics 
The Tekna tribes speak Hassaniya Arabic and the Berber Shilha dialect in varying degrees.

All Tekna are Muslims, belonging to the Maliki school of Sunni Islam. Their traditional lifestyle was partly nomadic, based on camel and goat herding, and partly sedentary, controlling important routes of the Saharan caravan trade.

The Tekna are divided into several Berber-speaking and Arabic-speaking tribes, which are organized into two tribal confederations or leff: 
 Aït Djemel confederacy (Western Tekna), consisting of the tribes of Aït Lahcen, Izerguiyen, Yaggout, and Aït Moussa Ou Ali ;
 Aït Atman (or Aït Bella) confederacy (Eastern Tekna), consisting of the tribes of Azouafit, Aït Yassine, Aït Oussa, Aït Brahim, and Aït Hmad.

History 
During the 17th century, Morocco under Sultan Ismail Ibn Sharif seized control over the territory from the Tafna River south to Senegal and Timbuktu. Contingents of Tekna troops were then sent to the Senegal valley on behalf of the Sultan.

After 1765 the Tekna revolted, acquiring greater autonomy. On May 30, 1767, Mohammed ben Abdallah, Sultan of Morocco, signed a peace and commerce treaty with King Charles III of Spain, recognizing that Morocco did not control the Tekna tribes.

However, at the time of the Spanish colonization and at the beginning of the 20th century, the Tekna tribes recognized the Sultan of Morocco as their sultan.

See also 
Maqil
Sanhaja
Beni Ḥassān
Morocco
Western Sahara
Sahrawi
Reguibat

References

Bibliography 
 Attilo Gaudio, "Les populations du Sahara occidental: histoire, vie et culture", ed. Karthala 1993, (Chap. VIII, pp. 97–116) 

Berbers in Western Sahara
Society of the Sahrawi Arab Democratic Republic
Muslim communities in Africa
Sahrawi tribes
Ethnic groups in Morocco
Ethnic groups in Western Sahara
Berbers in Morocco